Crayons is the seventeenth and final studio album by American singer Donna Summer. It was released through Sony Burgundy on May 20, 2008 in the United States. Recorded over a period of two years since signing with the Sony Music label in 2006, Crayons marked Summer's first full-length studio album in fourteen years since 1994's Christmas Spirit, and her first album of original material since 1991's Mistaken Identity. She worked with a number of different producers and songwriters on the album, including Greg Kurstin, J. R. Rotem, Wayne Hector, Toby Gad, Lester Mendez.

The album debuted and peaked at number 17 on the US Billboard 200 and entered the top fifty of the Italian Albums Chart. Crayons was preceded by its first official single, "Stamp Your Feet", which was released to radio on April 15, 2008. A follow-up, "I'm a Fire", reached number-one on the US Dance Club Songs, giving Summer her 13th number-one hit on that chart. Crayons marked Summer's last album released before her death on May 17, 2012.

Background
Crayons marked Summer's first full-length studio album in fourteen years since 1994's Christmas Spirit. When commenting on the album, Summer explained, "I wanted this album to have a lot of different directions on it [...] I did not want it to be any one baby. I just wanted it to be a sampler of flavors and influences from all over the world. There's a touch of this, a little smidgeon of that, a dash of something else [...] like when you're cooking." The lead track "Stamp Your Feet" was originally called "The Player's Anthem" and talks about "being a player in life, coupled with the idea of being a player on an actual field, the whole thing, dealing with the pain and doing things even though you are afraid."

Summer wrote "The Queen Is Back" and "Mr. Music" with Jonathan "J.R." Rotem and Evan Bogart, whose father, Casablanca Records boss Neil Bogart, died from cancer at the age of 39. When Summer met Evan Bogart, she was struck by his uncanny resemblance to his label executive father, commenting: "Evan and I hit it off immediately; there was a synergy that happened really quickly." "The Queen is Back," which discusses her musical legacy and public persona, samples "Lose Control" by Kevin Federline. Both songs were produced by Rotem. About the song "Crayons", Summer said, "It encompasses a lot of what the album is about [...] Everybody gets crayons at some point in their lives, everybody can relate to the basics. It comes down to that child in us, I think there's a commonality in the concept of crayons."

Critical reception

At Metacritic, which assigns a normalized rating out of 100 to reviews from mainstream critics, Crayons has an average score of 66 based on 12 reviews, indicating "generally favorable reviews." Billboard felt that "this surprisingly lively set finds the former disco diva teaming with a crew of young collaborators for a series of uptempo forays into stomping dance-pop, juke-joint blues-rock, breezy Latin jazz and African-accented soul." Christian John Wikane from PopMatters wrote that "the core theme of Crayons is variety. It brazenly flaunts a collage of sounds, while showcasing the multiplicity of Donna Summer's musical selves." In his review for The Village Voice, Alfred Soto found that "on Crayons, it's like no time has passed at all, and of course it hasn't: As Lloyd Richards says to Margo Channing in All About Eve, the stars never die and never change."

Allmusic editor Andy Kellman found that Crayons "benefits from Summer's effortless energy; she was clearly into making this album, and her voice is as able and flexible as ever. However, almost all of the material with which she has to work [...] would make more sense on an album by a female teen pop group from the UK or, in some cases, a young adult catering to the coffeehouse market [...] In-fashion vocal effects, which Summer certainly does not need, detract from a handful of these tracks, but as a whole, the album won't have trouble pleasing fans who just want to hear their queen have a blast and tear it up." Slant Magazine critic Eric Henderson wrote that the album was Summer's "attempt to finally share, but the results are about as personal as food-dyed wax. The music is harmlessly listenable, and the requisite nods to her dance-floor legacy."

Commercial performance
Crayons  debuted and peaked at number 17 on the US Billboard 200 first-week sales of 23,000 units, marking Summer's highest-charting album since her 1983 album She Works Hard for the Money. By November 2008, it had moved 69,000 copies in the United States.

Track listing

Charts

Certifications

Release history

References

2008 albums
Albums produced by Greg Kurstin
Albums produced by J. R. Rotem
Albums produced by Toby Gad
Burgundy Records albums
Donna Summer albums
Hip hop albums by American artists
Albums produced by Sebastian Arocha Morton